Nelson Martín Crossa (born February 2, 1977 in Buenos Aires, Argentina) is an Argentine-Uruguayan footballer.

Teams
  Miramar Misiones 1998-2002
  IFK Göteborg 2003
  Miramar Misiones 2003-2004
  Everton 2004
  Lierse 2005-2006
  Progreso 2007
  Belgrano de Córdoba 2007-2008
  Central Español 2008-2009
  Club Social y Deportivo Municipal 2009-2010
  Xelajú MC 2010–2011
  Racing Club 2011-2012
  Miramar Misiones 2012-2013

Titles
  Club Social y Deportivo Municipal 2009

References
 Profile at BDFA 

1977 births
Living people
Uruguayan footballers
Uruguayan expatriate footballers
Argentine footballers
Argentine expatriate footballers
Uruguayan Primera División players
Belgian Pro League players
Allsvenskan players
Club Atlético Belgrano footballers
C.S.D. Municipal players
Xelajú MC players
C.A. Progreso players
Miramar Misiones players
Lierse S.K. players
IFK Göteborg players
Everton de Viña del Mar footballers
Central Español players
Racing Club de Montevideo players
Expatriate footballers in Chile
Expatriate footballers in Argentina
Expatriate footballers in Guatemala
Expatriate footballers in Uruguay
Expatriate footballers in Belgium
Expatriate footballers in Sweden
Association football forwards
Footballers from Buenos Aires